Monticelli is an Italian surname. Notable people with the surname include:

Adolphe Joseph Thomas Monticelli (1824–1886), French painter
Angelo Monticelli (1778–1837), Italian painter
Angelo Maria Monticelli (c. 1710–1758), Italian opera singer
Francesco Saverio Monticelli (1863–1927), Italian zoologist
Mario Monticelli (1902–1995), Italian chess player

Italian-language surnames